Zhang Lei (born 7 October 1981) is a Chinese singer. He took part in The Voice of China Season 4, when he sang the song "南山南." He then went on to be Team Na Ying's team champion and was the overall Champion of the season. He beat Queen T (陈梓童) from Team Jay Chou, who settled for the runner-up position. At the same time, he also celebrated his 34th birthday at the Beijing National Stadium at the live show of The Voice of China Season 4.

The Voice of China (season 4)
Zhang Lei went to The Voice of China Season 4 and was broadcast on the 3rd episode. He sang the song "南山南" and had 3 turns, all except for Jay Chou's. He then chose Na Ying to be his coach. In The Battles, he went against Zhū Qiáng (朱强), a student from the third season who failed to get any turns. He then went on to be in one of Team Na Ying's top 4. In the cross battle, he fought with Leon Lee (李安) in Team Jay Chou, and had a landslide victory of 47–4 and made it to the overall top 10. Next, he went on and made it to the overall top 5 with the highest score of 94.6% and was announced as Team Na Ying's team champion. In the finals, he made it to the overall top 2 with again the highest score along with Queen T (陈梓童) from Team Jay Chou. In the final round, he won Queen T with the score of 58.53% to 41.47%, who settled for second place.

References

1981 births
Living people
The Voice of China contestants